Slakbash (Iślaqbaş) is a rural locality (a village) in Yamakayevsky Selsoviet, Blagovarsky District, Bashkortostan, Russia. The population was 42 as of 2010. There is 1 street.

Geography 
Slakbash is located 16 km south of Yazykovo (the district's administrative centre) by road. Yamakay is the nearest rural locality.

References 

Rural localities in Blagovarsky District